The women's heptathlon event at the 1996 World Junior Championships in Athletics was held in Sydney, Australia, at International Athletic Centre on 23 and 24 August.

Medalists

Results

Final
23/24 August

Participation
According to an unofficial count, 13 athletes from 8 countries participated in the event.

References

Heptathlon
Combined events at the World Athletics U20 Championships